Tillandsia montana is a species of plant in the genus Tillandsia. This species is endemic to Brazil.
The Latin specific epithet montana refers to mountains or coming from mountains.

References

montana
Flora of Brazil